Ilgar, also known as Garig-Ilgar after its two dialects, is an extinct Iwaidjan language spoken in the mainland of Cobourg Peninsula, around Port Essington, Northern Territory.

Phonology

Consonant inventory

Unlike many Australian languages, Ilgar does not have lamino-alveolars.

Vowels
Evans(1998) briefly discusses vowels in his paper noting that Iwaidjan languages including Ilgar have a three vowel ( /a/, /i/, /u/) system typical of most Australian languages.

References

Further reading

Evans, N. (2007). Pseudo-argument affixes in Iwaidja and Ilgar: a case of deponent subject and object agreement. In M. Baerman, G. G. Corbett, D. Brown, & A. Hippisley (Eds.), Deponency and morphological mismatches (pp. 271–296). Oxford: Oxford University Press.
Evans,N. (1994). Ilgar Field Notes, Recorded from Charlie Wardaga.

Iwaidjan languages
Languages extinct in the 2000s